A plumbline is a string with a lead (Latin plumbum) weight or plumb bob, used to provide a vertical reference line.

It may also refer to:

The Plumbline, a joke newspaper produced by the McMaster Engineering Society
 In geodesy, a plumbline means a line orthogonal to the geoid, the vertical direction

ja:鉛直